Charles Thorp (1882-1953) was an English cricketer active from 1908 to 1909 who played for Northamptonshire (Northants). He was born in Fotheringhay on 11 August 1882 and died there on 5 May 1953. He appeared in nine first-class matches as a righthanded batsman who scored 195 runs with a highest score of 50.

Notes

1882 births
1953 deaths
English cricketers
Northamptonshire cricketers
People from Fotheringhay